La Carlota may refer to:
La Carlota, Negros Occidental, a fourth class city in the central Philippine province of Negros Occidental.
La Carlota, Spain, a municipality in the province of Córdoba, in the autonomous community of Andalusia, Spain.
La Carlota, Argentina, a municipality in the Argentine province of Córdoba.
Generalissimo Francisco de Miranda Airbase, an urban airbase in Caracas, Venezuela, commonly referred to as "La Carlota".